American Association may refer to:

Baseball
 American Association (1882–1891), a major league active from 1882 to 1891
 American Association (1902–1997), a minor league active from 1902 to 1962 and 1969 to 1997
 American Association of Professional Baseball, an independent league founded in 2006

Football
 American Association (American football), a minor professional American football league that existed from 1936 to 1950